Martina Guiggi (born 1 May 1984) is an Italian volleyball player who plays as a middle blocker. She competed at the 2008 and 2016 Olympics and won the 2007 Women's European Volleyball Championship and 2007 FIVB Women's World Cup.

Career
Guiggi was included to the national team in 2002, and in 2006 was named Best Blocker of the European Cup. She played at the 2013 Club World Championship with Guangdong Evergrande winning the bronze medal after defeating  Voléro Zürich 3–1. Besides indoors volleyball she competed nationally in beach volleyball.

Clubs
  Asystel Novara (2001–2004)
  Scavolini Pesaro (2004–2011)
  MC-Carnaghi Villa Cortese (2011–2012)
  Chieri Volley (2012–2013)
  Guangdong Evergrande (2013–2014)
  AGIL Novara (2014–2016)

Personal life
Martina Guiggi is married to Mitar Tzourits.

Awards

Clubs
 2013 Club World Championship –  Bronze medal, with Guangdong Evergrande

References

External links 

 Martina Guiggi at the International Volleyball Federation
 
 
 
 

1984 births
Living people
Sportspeople from Pisa
Italian women's volleyball players
Italian expatriate sportspeople in China
Italian expatriate sportspeople in Greece
Italian expatriate sportspeople in Slovenia
Expatriate volleyball players in Slovenia
Olympic volleyball players of Italy
Volleyball players at the 2008 Summer Olympics
Volleyball players at the 2016 Summer Olympics
Mediterranean Games medalists in volleyball
Mediterranean Games gold medalists for Italy
Competitors at the 2009 Mediterranean Games